Destruction Derby Arenas is a racing video game for the PlayStation 2. It was developed by Studio 33 and was released in 2004, being the fourth installment of the Destruction Derby series.

Reception

Destruction Derby Arenas received "mixed" reviews according to the review aggregation website Metacritic. IGN felt the game was worth an hour or two due to car crashes, but after that would quickly lose value. GameSpot felt the online mode was worth renting the game for genre fans, but that the game otherwise did not justify its cost.

References

External links
 
 

2004 video games
Gathering of Developers games
Multiplayer and single-player video games
PlayStation 2 games
PlayStation 2-only games
Racing video games
Sony Interactive Entertainment games
Video games developed in the United Kingdom